The 2016 NBA Summer League consisted of three pro basketball leagues organized by the National Basketball Association (NBA): the Orlando Pro Summer League, Utah Jazz Summer League, and Las Vegas Summer League.

Ten teams participated in the week-long Orlando Pro Summer League at Amway Center in Orlando, Florida, from July 2 to 8, 2016. The Orlando Magic (White) won the Orlando Pro Summer League championship over the Detroit Pistons, 87–84 in overtime. Arinze Onuaku of Orlando Magic (White) was named the MVP. The Dallas Mavericks and Miami Heat also participated in the Las Vegas Summer League.

The Utah Jazz Summer League was introduced for the first time last year, marking the first summer league to be played in Utah since the Rocky Mountain Revue was last held in 2008. Four teams participated in a round-robin format from July 4 to 7, 2016. No tournament was held, nor was there a champion named, but the Boston Celtics had the best record of the four teams with an undefeated record of 3–0. All four teams (Utah Jazz, Boston Celtics, Philadelphia 76ers, and San Antonio Spurs) also participated in the Las Vegas Summer League.

The Las Vegas NBA Summer League is the official summer league of the National Basketball Association. It is the premier summer league of the three, with a total of 23 teams, plus a Select Team from the NBA Development League, participating. A total of 67 games were played from July 8 to 18, 2016, at the Thomas & Mack Center and Cox Pavilion, both located in Paradise, Nevada (near Las Vegas). The Chicago Bulls won the championship by defeating the Minnesota Timberwolves in the final, 84–82, on a buzzer-beater by Denzel Valentine in overtime. Tyus Jones was named the league's Most Valuable Player, with Jerian Grant of the Bulls being named the championship game MVP.

Orlando Pro Summer League
Officially known as the Southwest Airlines Orlando Pro Summer League for sponsorship reasons, this 25-game, week-long event will feature ten teams. Each team will play five games over the course of the week, with a championship day being played on the final day of the league. A point system will establish the standings leading up to the final day, with eight points awarded each game based on: four points for winning the game and one point for winning a quarter (in the event of a tied quarter, each team will receive 0.5 points). In the event of ties in seeding heading into championship day, three tiebreakers will be in place: 1) total point differential; 2) total points allowed; 3) coin flip.

Teams

Orlando Magic White (host)
Orlando Magic Blue (host)
Charlotte Hornets
Dallas Mavericks
Detroit Pistons
Indiana Pacers
Los Angeles Clippers
Miami Heat
New York Knicks
Oklahoma City Thunder

Orlando Schedule
All times are in Eastern Daylight Time (UTC−4)

Day 1

Day 2

Day 3

Day 4

Day 5

Day 6

Championship day
Each team will play one game on the league's final day for either first, third, fifth, seventh or ninth place.

Seeding Criteria
The seeding will be determined by a team's total points after the first five days. Eight points will be awarded in each game: four points for winning a game and one point for every quarter a team won. In the event of a tied quarter, each team is awarded half a point. If two or more teams had equal points, then the following tiebreakers applied:
Total point differential
Least total points allowed
Coin flip
Each odd-numbered seed will be paired with the team seeded immediately below it. For example, the top two seeds will play in the championship game, the third and fourth seeds will play in the third-place game, etc.

Standings/seedings

Championship Day Schedule
All times are in Eastern Daylight Time (UTC−4)

Ninth Place Game

Seventh Place Game
{{Basketballbox|bg=#eee |date=July 8 |time=2:00 pm |place=Amway Center, Orlando, Florida |TV=NBA TV
|team1=Orlando Magic Blue |score1=79
|team2=Indiana Pacers |score2=85
|report=Boxscore
|Q1=11–24 |Q2=18–13 |Q3=19–27 |Q4= 31–21
|points1=Nick Johnson 20 |points2=Glenn Robinson III 14
|rebounds1=Okaro White 7  |rebounds2= Jamari Traylor 7
|assist1=Nick Johnson 8  |assist2=Nate Wolters 5
|attendance=
|referee=Dedric Taylor, Tyler Ricks, Wesley Ford 
}}

Fifth Place Game

Third Place Game

Championship

Final standings

Statistical leaders
Reference: 

Points

Rebounds

Assists

Honors
Josh Cohen of the Orlando Magic's website ranked the top five most valuable players in the Orlando Pro Summer League 
 Arinze Onuaku, Orlando Magic White (MVP) Stanley Johnson, Detroit Pistons 
 Cameron Payne, Oklahoma City Thunder 
 Josh Richardson, Miami Heat 
 Glenn Robinson III, Indiana Pacers

Utah Jazz Summer League
In its now second year, the Utah Jazz Summer League will host four teams. Each team will play each other in a round-robin format for a total of six games, with each team playing each day (July 4, 5, and 7).

Teams

Utah Jazz (host)
Boston Celtics
Philadelphia 76ers
San Antonio Spurs

Utah Schedule
All times are in Eastern Daylight Time (UTC−4)

Day 1

Day 2

Day 3

Final Results

Statistical leaders
Reference: 

Points

Rebounds

Assists

Las Vegas NBA Summer League
Officially known as the Samsung NBA Summer League for sponsorship reasons, the Las Vegas NBA Summer League is the official summer league of the NBA. It is the premier summer league of the three, with a total of 23 teams, plus a Select Team from the NBA Development League, participating. A total of 67 games will be played from July 8 to 18, 2016, at the Thomas & Mack Center and Cox Pavilion, both located in Paradise, Nevada (near Las Vegas). Teams will compete in three preliminary games beginning on July 8 before being seeded in a tournament that leads to the Championship Game on July 18. Each team will play at least five games in Las Vegas.

Teams

Atlanta Hawks
Boston Celtics
Brooklyn Nets
Chicago Bulls
Cleveland Cavaliers
Dallas Mavericks
Denver Nuggets
Golden State Warriors
Houston Rockets
Los Angeles Lakers
Memphis Grizzlies
Miami Heat
Milwaukee Bucks
Minnesota Timberwolves
NBA D-League Select
New Orleans Pelicans
Philadelphia 76ers
Phoenix Suns
Portland Trail Blazers
Sacramento Kings
San Antonio Spurs
Toronto Raptors
Utah Jazz
Washington Wizards

Las Vegas Schedule
Source: 
All times are in Eastern Daylight Time (UTC−4)

Day 1

Day 2

Day 3

Day 4

Day 5

Championship
The championship is determined by a single-elimination tournament; the top 8 teams receive a first-round bye.

Seeding criteria

Teams are seeded first by overall record, then by a tiebreaker system
Head-to-head result (applicable only to ties between two teams, not to multiple-team ties)
Quarter point system (1 point for win, .5 for tie, 0 for loss, 0 for overtime periods)
Point differential
Coin flip

First-round losers will play consolation games to determine 17th through 24th places based on the tiebreaker system stated above. Second-round losers will play consolation games to determine ninth through 16th places.

Standings/seedings

Bracket

Tournament schedule
All times are in Eastern Daylight Time (UTC−4)
Source: 

First round

Second round

Consolation Round

Quarterfinals

Semifinals

Final

Final standings

Statistical leaders
Reference: 

Points

Rebounds

Assists

Honors
The All-Summer League First and Second Teams were selected by a panel of media members in attendance at the Las Vegas NBA Summer League.All-NBA Summer League First TeamTyus Jones, Minnesota Timberwolves (2016 Tournament MVP)Jordan McRae, Cleveland Cavaliers
Bobby Portis, Chicago Bulls
Ben Simmons, Philadelphia 76ers
Alan Williams, Phoenix SunsAll-NBA Summer League Second TeamJaylen Brown, Boston Celtics
Thon Maker, Milwaukee Bucks
Kelly Oubre Jr., Washington Wizards
Norman Powell, Toronto Raptors
Tyler Ulis, Phoenix SunsChampionship Game MVP:''' Jerian Grant, Chicago Bulls

References

External links
Official site

2016
Summer League
2016–17 in American basketball by league
2016 in sports in Florida
2016 in sports in Nevada
2016 in sports in Utah
July 2016 sports events in the United States